Zhengxu line of Zhengzhou Metro, also known as Line 17, is a rapid transit line connecting Zhengzhou and Xuchang in Henan Province that is currently under testing. It is expected to open in 2023.

Stations

References 

Zhengzhou Metro lines